Carlos Gabriel Salazar (born 5 September 1964) is an Argentine former professional boxer who competed from 1985 to 1998. He is a world champion in two weight classes, having held the IBF super flyweight title from 1995 to 1996, and the WBO flyweight title from 1996 and 1998.

Professional career

As a professional he had 58 fights (47–3–8), from 1985 to 1998. He campaigned at the flyweight and super flyweight divisions, winning world titles in both. After 3 unsuccessful attempts at the world title, Salazar became the IBF World super flyweight champion when he beat Harold Grey in 1995. He would defend the title once before losing it to the same Harold Grey. After that he decided to move down to flyweight and campaign for the WBO World title, winning it against Alberto Jiménez. He defended that title 5 times before losing it to Rubén Sánchez León in controversial fashion as he cited he was hit after the referee had stopped actions and the punch caused him a broken jaw. Salazar decided to retire from boxing after the fight citing medical issues.

Professional boxing record

See also
List of flyweight boxing champions
List of super-flyweight boxing champions

External links

1964 births
Living people
Flyweight boxers
Super-flyweight boxers
World flyweight boxing champions
World super-flyweight boxing champions
International Boxing Federation champions
World Boxing Organization champions
People from Presidencia Roque Sáenz Peña
Argentine male boxers
Olympic boxers of Argentina
Boxers at the 1984 Summer Olympics
Sportspeople from Chaco Province